is a Japanese politician of the Democratic Party of Japan, a member of the House of Councillors in the Diet (national legislature). A native of Hamamatsu, Shizuoka, he graduated from Waseda University and received his master's degree from Michigan State University. In 2004, he was elected to the House of Councillors for the first time.

References

External links 
  in Japanese.

1957 births
Living people
Chuo University alumni
Michigan State University alumni
Members of the House of Councillors (Japan)
People from Hamamatsu
Democratic Party of Japan politicians